The 1982 Dora Mavor Moore Awards celebrated excellence in theatre from the Toronto Alliance for the Performing Arts.

Winners and nominees

General Theatre Division

Musical Theatre or Revue Division

See also
36th Tony Awards
1982 Laurence Olivier Awards

References

1982 in Toronto
Dora Awards, 1982
Dora Mavor Moore Awards ceremonies